Jogja National Museum (JNM) is a contemporary art museum in Yogyakarta, Indonesia. JNM has established under Yayasan Yogyakarta Seni Nusantara (YYSN) management, JNM building complex was first a Former First Indonesia Visual Art School (ASRI-1950) and Faculty of Visual Art and Design (FSRD-1984) which later became Indonesian Institute of the Arts, Yogyakarta.

See also 
List of museums and cultural institutions in Indonesia

References 

Art museums and galleries in Indonesia
Museums in Yogyakarta